Favorinus blianus is a species of sea slug, an aeolid nudibranch in the family Facelinidae.

Description 
The maximum recorded body length is 13 mm.

Habitat 
Minimum recorded depth is 0 m. Maximum recorded depth is 2 m.

References

External links 

Facelinidae
Gastropods described in 1955
Taxa named by Ernst Marcus (zoologist)